Josh Boone may refer to:

 Josh Boone (basketball) (born 1984), American professional basketball player
 Josh Boone (director) (born 1979), American film director
 Josh Boone (soccer) (born 1992), American professional soccer player